David Flintoff (born 11 January 1964) is a former Australian rules footballer who played with Hawthorn and Melbourne in the Victorian Football League (VFL).

Flintoff made just one appearance for Hawthorn in 1983 before leaving the VFL and joining Central District in South Australia. A rover, he returned to the league in 1988 when he was signed up by Melbourne and played from the interchange bench in the 1988 VFL Grand Final.

References

Holmesby, Russell and Main, Jim (2007). The Encyclopedia of AFL Footballers. 7th ed. Melbourne: Bas Publishing.

1964 births
Living people
Australian rules footballers from Victoria (Australia)
Hawthorn Football Club players
Melbourne Football Club players
Central District Football Club players